Rajya Sabha elections were held on various dates in 1963, to elect members of the Rajya Sabha, Indian Parliament's upper chamber.

Elections
Elections were held to elect members from various states.

Members elected
The following members are elected in the elections held in 1963. They are members for the term 1963-1969 and retire in year 1969, except in case of the resignation or death before the term.
The list is incomplete.

State - Member - Party

Bye-elections
The following bye elections were held in the year 1963.

State - Member - Party

  Maharashtra -Y B Chavan - INC ( ele 021/02/1963 term till 1966 ) res. 21/12/1963
  Madras - T Chengalvaroyan - INC ( ele  09/08/1963 term till 1966 )
  West Bengal - R K Bhuwalka - OTH ( ele  09/09/1963 term till 1968)
  Rajasthan - Sharda Bhargava - INC ( ele  22/08/1963 term till 1966 )
  Uttar Pradesh - Shyam Kumari Khan - INC ( ele  11/12/1963 term till 1966 )
  Uttar Pradesh - Joginder Singh - INC ( ele  11/12/1963 term till 1966 )
  Uttar Pradesh - Col B H Zaidi  - INC ( ele  11/12/1963 term till 1964 )

References

1963 elections in India
1963